Pholidobolus fascinatus is a species of lizard in the family Gymnophthalmidae. It is endemic to Ecuador.

References

Pholidobolus
Reptiles of Ecuador
Endemic fauna of Ecuador
Reptiles described in 2020